Honeysuckle Lodge is a historic home located at Salisbury, Wicomico County, Maryland, United States. It is a -story eclectic frame dwelling built in stages during the first half of the 20th century. The home has a Colonial Revival style.  Also on the property is a 1-story, frame guest house built around 1940. The asbestos-shingled frame structure is supported by a continuous brick foundation, and the medium-sloped gable roof is covered with asphalt shingles. The yard is planted with mature trees and shrubs.

Honeysuckle Lodge was listed on the National Register of Historic Places in 1996.

References

External links
, including photo from 1994, at Maryland Historical Trust

Houses on the National Register of Historic Places in Maryland
Houses in Wicomico County, Maryland
Colonial Revival architecture in Maryland
Buildings and structures in Salisbury, Maryland
National Register of Historic Places in Wicomico County, Maryland